Double Exposure is an American, Philadelphia-based  disco  group. They are best known for their 1976 hit, "Ten Percent".

History
The group formed in 1961 with Leonard "Butch" Davis, Charles Whittington, Jimmy Williams and Joe Harris. They were originally known as the United Image and released two singles, "Love's Creeping Up on Me" on Stax Records in 1971 and "The African Bump" on Branding Iron Records in 1972.

They were signed to Salsoul Records in 1975 and released their debut album, Ten Percent in 1976. The album featured the title track, which was remixed by Walter Gibbons and reached No. 54 on the Billboard Hot 100 and No. 2 on the dance/disco charts. The tracks "Everyman (Has to Carry His Own Weight) and "My Love Is Free" were also popular club songs.

In 2001, a dance group called M&S used samples from Double Exposure's "Everyman" in their song called "Salsoul Nugget".

In September 2008, they recorded new material an Eli/Dixon/Green composition called "Soul Recession"/Soultronics Records at Eli's Studio E (The Grooveyard) facility in Philadelphia. Some original Salsoul/Philly/TSOP (The Sound of Philadelphia)/MFSB (Gamble and Huff) session musicians have appeared on "Soul Recession", including Earl Young, Bobby Eli, Dennis Harris, T.G. Conway, Jimmy Williams and Rikki Hicks.

Jimmy Williams died in October 2016.

In 2018, new members Kenny Pitt and Lorenzo Bell are performing with the original band members to keep the Double Exposure sound alive. 

In 2022 Salsoul re-released the "Ten Percent" album and is also available for streaming.

Discography

Studio albums

Compilations
 The Best of Double Exposure (Charly, 1999)
 The Anthology (Suss'd, 2006)
 My Love Is Free: The Best of Double Exposure (Koch, 2006)

Singles

References

External links

 
Double Exposure on Soul Tracks

American dance music groups
Musical groups from Pennsylvania
Salsoul Records artists
Musical groups from Philadelphia